Debbie Watson may refer to:

Debbie Watson (actress) (born 1949), American actress
Debbie Watson (water polo) (born 1965), Australian water polo player